The seeds of rugby league in Lebanon lie in Australia. A group of Australian-born rugby league players with Lebanese heritage, mostly from inner-city Sydney formed a team with a view to entering the 2000 Rugby League World Cup. They were accepted into the qualifying tournament on the agreement that they would aim to develop rugby league within the country they represent. They subsequently went on to win the qualifying competition, earning  their place by defeating Italy and Morocco of the Mediterranean group before travelling to Florida to defeat the  USA, winners of the Pacific group.

In 2002 a domestic league was set up in Lebanon, initially with four university-based teams. Players from the domestic competition now feature in the national team. A team composed entirely from Lebanese domestic players, known as Lebanon Espoirs has been formed.

In 2011, Lebanon nearly qualified for 2013 Rugby League World Cup but lost to Italy who became the 14th and final nation to qualify for the event.

In 2011, the government of Lebanon promised to increase its support and funding for rugby league.

Governing body and competitions

The Lebanese Rugby League Federation is based in Safra, Lebanon. It is an associate members of the Rugby League European Federation and a full member of the Rugby League International Federation.

Lebanon Rugby League Championship

There are eight teams that play in the Bank of Beirut Lebanon Championship domestic league.

Media

Media representation of rugby league has grown dramatically with the domestic competition now covered by all ten marquee Lebanese newspapers, two prominent radio stations and the country's major television stations.

Lebanese rugby league is often featured on the Qatar-based Al Jazeera network. Al Jazeera televised the first game report of a game in Lebanon in 2007. 

2007 Al Jazeera Feature on Youtube

The National Team

The Lebanon national rugby league team, nicknamed the Cedars, remains mostly composed of players of Lebanese ancestry from Australia.  The Lebanon Espoirs team, made up of younger players from the domestic competition, has played a number of fixtures - this team has competed annually in the Rugby League Mediterranean Cup, which is hosted in Lebanon. Many of the Espoirs players have gone into represent Lebanon in full international matches. The Cedars have been largely successful in international competition - they were unbeaten in 12 tests between 2000 and 2007, a record which included two draws against Ireland. This winning streak ended with a 38–16 loss to Samoa in the final game of their 2008 Rugby League World Cup qualification campaign.

The team qualified and played in the 2017 Rugby League World Cup, winning their first ever world cup game against France in the qualifying group stage which resulted in the team competing in the quarter finals. The Cedars lost the quarter finals to Tonga 24- 22. The team also received many plaudits for their performances against Australia and England.

Liban Espoir

Since the creation of a five-team domestic league in Lebanon in 2003, a second team was formed made up of players from that league under Head Coach Remond Safi. They are known as the Liban Espoir and regularly tour other countries. In 2003 the team toured Morocco. In 2005 they toured England and Wales, playing numerous matches against the England Lionhearts, Welsh Presidents XIII and Rugby League Conference teams. In 2006 they recorded their first victory on tour in Cyprus against a British combined services team. In 2007 they beat the main Serbian national team 16-14 and went on to defeat a Serbia Development XIII 50–0. In 2008 they played the United Arab Emirates of the Emirates Rugby League, the first game ever to be played by the nation. The match was played in Bhamdoun with the Liban Espoir eventually winning 48–18. In 2009, Liban Espoir played the UAE Falcons in a three-game series.  The first game, played in Dubai at The Sevens stadium ended early with the UAE Falcons leading 16-6 because of a mass brawl. The remaining two games were played at The Sevens and Bhamdoun. In the second game, at The Sevens, The Espoirs were defeated 34–10.

Touch Football 

The Lebanon national touch football team debuted in 1999. It has qualified for the 1999 World Cup in Australia where the Men's Over 30s won silver, Mixed Open won bronze and Men's Open came 5th. In the 2001 Youth World Cup in New Zealand the Lebanese Men's Under 18s team finished 4th and Men's Under 20s came 6th. In the 2005 Youth World Cup in Australia the Men's Under 20s defeated South Africa to win the bronze medal. In the 2007 World Cup in South Africa the Men's Opens team defeated Japan to win the bronze medal. Lebanon are currently ranked third in the world behind Australia and New Zealand.

See also

References

External links
Official website of the Lebanese Rugby League
Al Jazeera special on Lebanese rugby league (on youtube)